The 2002 Torneo Descentralizado was the 86th season of the top category of Peruvian football (soccer). It was played by 12 teams. The national champion was Sporting Cristal.

Competition modus 
The national championship was divided into two and half-year tournaments, the Torneo Apertura and the Torneo Clausura. Each was played on a home-and-away round-robin basis. The winners of each would play for the national title in a playoff, but a team had to finish in the top 4 in both tournaments to earn the right to play the final. If the same club had won both tournaments, it would have won the national championship automatically.

Following-season Copa Libertadores berths went to each half-year tournament winner, and the best-placed team in the aggregate table. The two bottom teams on the aggregate table were relegated, but a playoff had to be played between the 10th- and 11th-placed teams since both obtained the same number of points (goal difference did not count as a tie-breaker).

Teams

Torneo Apertura

League table

Results

Apertura playoff

Torneo Clausura

Final playoff 

No final playoff was played since the Apertura winner Universitario did not finish in the Clausura's top 4, while Sporting Cristal won the Clausura after placing third in the Apertura.

Title

Aggregate table

Promotion play-off

Top scorers

External links 
 Peru 2002 season Details on RSSSF

Peruvian Primera División seasons
Peru
Primera Division Peruana